Thomas Sutherland Parker (April 3, 1829 – October 24, 1868) was a physician and political figure in Ontario, Canada. He represented Wellington Centre in the House of Commons of Canada as a Liberal member from 1867 to 1868.

He was born in Bradford in Upper Canada in 1829, the son of Robert Parker. He studied medicine at Victoria College in Cobourg and Jefferson Medical College in Philadelphia, became a doctor and practised medicine in Guelph. Parker was elected to the Legislative Assembly of the Province of Canada for the North riding of Wellington in 1863. He was elected to the 1st Canadian Parliament in 1867 and died in Guelph in 1868 while still in office, as a result of an accidental fall through a bridge after a visit to a sick child near Rockwood.

References 

1829 births
1868 deaths
Members of the Legislative Assembly of the Province of Canada from Canada West
Liberal Party of Canada MPs
Members of the House of Commons of Canada from Ontario
Road incident deaths in Canada
Accidental deaths in Ontario